D.H.S.K. Law College ( Dibrugarh Hanumanbux Surajmal Kanoi Law College ) is a private aided law school situated beside Red Cross Road at Khaliharmari in Dibrugarh in the Indian state of Assam. It offers 3 years  LL.B. courses affiliated to Dibrugarh University. This college is recognised by Bar Council of India, New Delhi. D.H.S.K. Law College was established in 1965.
D.H.S.K. Law College is the 2nd oldest law college in Upper Assam Division and 3rd in the Northeast India.

References

Law schools in Assam
Colleges affiliated to Dibrugarh University
Educational institutions established in 1965
1965 establishments in Assam